Rossija tournament 1984 was played in Kemerovo on 3-7 February 1984. The Soviet Union won the tournament.

The tournament was decided by round-robin results like a group stage.

Results

Sources 
 Norges herrlandskamper i bandy 
 Sverige-Sovjet i bandy 
 Rossija Tournament 

1984 in Soviet sport
1984 in bandy
1984